Alexander Cossart Hassé (1813-1894) was a Moravian bishop.  He contributed to the monthly magazine The Fraternal Messenger. He is the author of The United Brethren (Moravians) in England. Hasse was also a botanist.

Life 
Hassé was born in Fulneck, Yorkshire to Christian Frederick Hasse and Ann Cossart. Hassé was a Deacon of the Moravian Church in 1844 and by 1883 he was Bishop. He was a collector of plant specimens in Silesia.

References

19th-century Moravian bishops
Date of birth unknown
Place of birth unknown
Date of death unknown
Place of death unknown